Patrick Kerr (born 31 July 1998) is a professional Australian rules footballer playing for the Carlton Football Club in the Australian Football League (AFL). He was drafted by Carlton with pick number 65 in the 2017 national draft. 

Kerr debuted in Carlton's 109 point loss to the Melbourne Football Club in  round 9 of the 2018 season. He played a total of four senior games for the club over two seasons before being delisted at the end of 2019.

Kerr is the grandson of Carlton Hall of Fame player Laurie Kerr who played 149 games for the club in the 1950s and Vivienne Kerr, Carlton's current number 1 female ticket holder.

Kerr played the 2021 season for the Port Melbourne Football Club in the Victorian Football League.

References

External links 
 Pat Kerr's profile on the official website of the Carlton Football Club
 

1998 births
Australian rules footballers from Victoria (Australia)
Carlton Football Club players
Preston Football Club (VFA) players
Port Melbourne Football Club players
Living people